Metallothionein-1M is a protein that in humans is encoded by the MT1M gene.

References

Further reading